Pan African Football SC is a Tanzanian football club based in Dar Es Salaam.

They play in the top level of Tanzanian professional football, the Tanzanian Premier League.

Achievements
Tanzanian Premier League: 1
 1982
Nyerere Cup: 3
 1978, 1979, 1981

Performance in CAF competitions
African Cup of Champions Clubs: 2 appearances
1983: Second Round
1989: Preliminary Round
CAF Cup Winners' Cup: 3 appearances
1979 – Second Round
1980 – Second Round
1982 – Second Round

Current squad

References

Football clubs in Tanzania
Sport in Dar es Salaam